Peter Jasper Akinola (born 27 January 1944, in Abeokuta) is the former Anglican Primate of the Church of Nigeria. He is also the former bishop of Abuja and Archbishop of Province III, which covered the northern and central parts of the country. When the division into ecclesiastical provinces was adopted in 2002, he became the first Archbishop of Abuja Province, a position he held until 2010. He is married and a father of six.

A "low church" Evangelical, Akinola emphasizes the Bible and the teachings of the apostles (apostolic tradition) in a particular way. As one of the leaders of the Global South within the Anglican Communion, Akinola has taken a firm stand against theological developments which he contends are incompatible with the biblical teachings of Christianity and orthodox Anglicanism, notably setting himself against any revisionist interpretations of the Bible and, in particular, opposing same-sex blessings, the ordination of non-celibate homosexuals and any homosexual practice. He was a leading name of conservatives throughout the Anglican Communion, including the Convocation of Anglicans in North America.

On 15 September 2009, Archbishop Nicholas Okoh, aged 57 years old, of Bendel Province, was elected the Primate of Church of Nigeria at the conference of the House of Bishops in Umuahia. He succeeded Akinola on 25 March 2010.

Biography

Akinola was born in 1944 to a Yoruba family in Abeokuta in southwestern Nigeria. His father died when he was four years old and due to financial pressures Akinola had to leave school early. He learned carpentry and at twenty he had a successful furniture business and as patent-medicine seller. He had finished high school by distance education. He left his business, to study for the priesthood. He studied at a Nigerian Anglican Seminary and was ordained a deacon in 1978 and a priest in 1979 in the Anglican Church of Nigeria. Soon after ordination, he moved to the United States to study at the Virginia Theological Seminary, where he graduated in 1981 with a master's degree.

Returning to Nigeria afterwards, Akinola was assigned to create an Anglican presence in the new capital Abuja which was about to be built. He holds it one of his greatest successes to have created out of nothing a vibrant Anglican community there. He was consecrated a bishop on 16 November 1989 and enthroned as the first Bishop of Abuja ten days later, at the inauguration of the new Diocese of Abuja on 26 November 1989. In 1997, he became archbishop of Province III of the Church of Nigeria, consisting of the northern dioceses of Nigeria. On 22 February 2000, he was elected primate of the Church of Nigeria, the second biggest church in the Anglican Communion, then numbering 18 million members. In 2002, he became Archbishop of the Abuja Province, a position he held until 2010.

Akinola was given the National Award of Commander of the Order of the Niger  in December 2003.

In 2006 Akinola appeared on TIME magazine'''s list of the world's 100 most influential people in the category Leaders and Revolutionaries. However, in 2007 TIME magazine suggested  that he "has some explaining to do" in relation to his support for legislation  criminalising "gay...  organizations" and "Publicity, procession and public show of same-sex amorous relationship through the electronic or print media physically, directly, indirectly or otherwise".

In 2007, the Nigerian newspaper ThisDay gave him together with 17 others a "Lifetime Achievement Award", stating in its citation:  "Called a bigot by some in the Anglican Church, his attitudes nonetheless represent a deep-rooted conservative tradition in African Christianity that is flourishing and growing."     But he has been criticised by other sections of the international press, including the right-leaning Daily Telegraph  which in an editorial on 23 March 2007 characterised him as one of the "extremists" who had "hijacked" conservative Anglicanism, and as "a deeply divisive figure" who has "defended new Nigerian legislation that makes "cancerous" (his word) same-sex activity punishable by up to five years' imprisonment."Akinola was at one time president of the Christian Association of Nigeria, an ecumenical body bringing together 52 million Protestant, Catholic, and African independent Christians. During his presidency, the National Ecumenical Centre in Abuja was completed, which had been a building ruin for 16 years.  Akinola was voted out of his position as national president of the Christian Association of Nigeria (CAN) in June 2007, and replaced by the Roman Catholic Archbishop of Nigeria, who polled 72 votes to Akinola's 33 votes. This followed criticism of Akinola's allegedly high handed leadership style and of his alleged failure to confront Nigerian president Obasanjo as other Christian leaders had. Subsequently, his candidacy as vice president was rejected by the General Assembly of the Christian Association of Nigeria.

In October 2009, he reacted to the Vatican's proposed creation of personal ordinariates for disaffected traditionalist Anglicans by saying that although he welcomed ecumenical dialogue and shared moral theology with the Catholic Church, the current GAFCON structures already meet the spiritual and pastoral needs of conservative Anglicans in Africa.

In November 2009, Akinola signed an ecumenical statement known as the Manhattan Declaration calling on evangelicals, Catholics and Orthodox not to comply with rules and laws permitting abortion, same-sex marriage and other matters that go against their religious consciences.

In 2010, upon his retirement as Primate of Nigeria, he launched the Peter Akinola Foundation, a "non-profit-making and non-governmental organisation that focuses on four main areas as Initiatives", respectively "Youth at Crossroad", "Mission and Evangelism", "Stand in the Gap" and "Anglican Unity and Self Reliance".

On 21 November 2015, Peter lost his Mother  Janet Amoke Akinola. She was aged 100 years.

 Church politics 

 Vision of the Church of Nigeria 
One of his first actions as primate was to get together 400 bishops, priests, lay members, and members of the Mothers' Union to elaborate a vision for the Church of Nigeria under chairman Ernest Shonekan, a former president of Nigeria.  The vision elaborated was: "The Church of Nigeria (Anglican Communion) shall be; bible-based, spiritually dynamic, united, disciplined, self supporting, committed to pragmatic evangelism, social welfare and a Church that epitomizes the genuine love of Christ."

Part of the program of actions were, e.g.
 on central level
 translating the books of liturgy in further languages
 establishing a group of 3000 leading lay personalities who will take care of fundraising and relieve the bishops of this duty
 establish a legal support team to enforce the constitutional right of freedom of religion and worship
 establish colleges for theology and universities
 provide internet access for the dioceses
 for each diocese
 training full-time itinerant evangelists
 on the job training for priests and their wives
 working out a social welfare program for less privileged people
 establish a hospital with at least 30 beds
 establish secondary schools
 on community level
 literacy courses for adults
 set up cottage industries for the unemployed

Relations with the Anglican Communion

In August 2003 he stated that if the celibate homosexual Jeffrey John was consecrated as Bishop of Reading or the non-celibate homosexual Gene Robinson consecrated as Bishop of New Hampshire, the Church of Nigeria would leave the Anglican Communion. A number of dioceses throughout the world, including the Diocese of Sydney, made similar statements. Under pressure from the Archbishop of Canterbury, John withdrew from appointment as bishop and was subsequently appointed as Dean of St Albans.  Gene Robinson's consecration went forward, precipitating a crisis in the Anglican Communion. At the end of 2003 Akinola commissioned together with Drexel Gomez, primate of the Church in the Province of the West Indies and Gregory Venables, Presiding Bishop of the Anglican Church of the Southern Cone Claiming our Anglican Identity: The Case Against the Episcopal Church, USA, a paper for the Primates of the Anglican Communion detailing the implications of the consecration of Gene Robinson for the Anglican Communion, in the view of conservative Primates.

His first reaction on the Windsor Report 2004 was outspoken and critical, but the statement from the Primates gathered at the first African Anglican Bishop's Conference, headed by Akinola, was more moderate and expressed commitment to the future of the Anglican Communion.  However, whilst strenuously supporting those parts of the Windsor Report which address the gay issue, he has not followed with those parts that deplore overseas interventions in the U.S. Church and has, on the contrary, set up a missionary body, the Convocation of Anglicans in North America, in order to formalise the ties between break-away Anglicans in the United States and the Church of Nigeria.

In September 2005, Akinola spoke out against the Church in Brazil deposition of an Evangelical bishop and excommunication of over 30 priests.

In September 2005, the Church of Nigeria redefined in its constitution its relationship to the Anglican Communion as "Communion with all Anglican Churches, Dioceses and Provinces that hold and maintain the Historic Faith, Doctrine, Sacrament and Discipline of the one Holy, Catholic, and Apostolic Church.". In a later press release, Akinola clarified "We want to state that our intention in amending the 2002 Constitution of the Church of Nigeria was to make clear that we are committed to the historic faith once delivered to the Saints, practice and the traditional formularies of the Church. ... We treasure our place within the worldwide family of the Anglican Communion but we are distressed by the unilateral actions of those provinces that are clearly determined to redefine what our common faith was once.  We have chosen not to be yoked to them as we prefer to exercise our freedom to remain faithful. We continue to pray, however, that there will be a genuine demonstration of repentance."

On 12 November 2005, Akinola signed a Covenant of Concordat with the Presiding Bishops of the Reformed Episcopal Church and the Anglican Province of America.

Akinola refused to take Holy Communion in company with the Presiding Bishop of the Episcopal Church, both at the Primates Meeting at Dromantine in 2005 and at the Primates Meeting at Dar es Salaam in 2007 and, on the latter occasion, he issued a press release in order to publicise and explain his refusal and that of others associated with him.

Akinola's name as chairman of the Global South Primates heads the list of signatories to a letter to the Archbishop of Canterbury on 15 November 2005. In this letter Europe is described as "a spiritual desert" and the actions of the Church of England in supporting the new civil partnerships laws are said to give "the appearance of evil".

Three of the bishops whose names appeared on the document at the Global South website (President Bishop Clive Handford of Jerusalem and the Middle East, the Primate of the West Indies Archbishop Drexel Gomez, and the Presiding Bishop of the Southern Cone Bishop Gregory Venables) denied signing or approving the letter, and criticised it as "an act of impatience", "scandalous", and "megaphone diplomacy".

Akinola was among the Global South leaders who opposed the consecration of Gene Robinson, the first openly homosexual bishop in the Anglican Communion. This group successfully pressed for the voluntary withdrawal of ECUSA's representatives from the Anglican Consultative Council's meeting in Nottingham in 2005, although representatives did attend in order to make a presentation supporting full inclusion of gays and lesbians in the life of the Church, for which a vote of thanks was passed.

In August 2005 he denounced a statement of the Church of England's House of Bishops on civil partnerships and called for the disciplining of the Church of England and ECUSA on the grounds that the Church has not changed its position on same-sex partnerships. Since the Anglican Communion has historically been defined as those Churches in communion with the See of Canterbury, whose archbishop is head of the Church of England and thus primus inter pares'' in the Anglican Communion, this led to speculation that Akinola was positioning himself as a possible international leader of a more conservative church than the present Anglican Communion, which would no longer recognise the authority or primacy of the Archbishop of Canterbury. However, he attended the subsequent Primates Meeting in Tanzania in 2007, although he absented himself from all the celebrations of Holy Communion during that meeting.

In May 2007 he flew to the United States to install Martyn Minns, a priest who had left the Episcopal Church of the United States, as a bishop of the Church of Nigeria. Akinola reportedly ignored requests not to do this from both the presiding bishop and the Archbishop of Canterbury. However, the timing of the requests and their intent, relative to Akinola's departure from Nigeria is a subject of contention.  The newly installed bishop indicated at a press conference that the intention was to replace the Episcopal Church of the USA (as an organ of the Anglican Communion) with a structure formed under auspices of the Church of Nigeria.

Akinola was one of the principal founders of the Global Anglican Future Conference, an international gathering of conservative and orthodox Anglican bishops and declared the Church of Nigeria in full communion with the newly created Anglican Church in North America, which was founded to create an alternative ecclesiastical structure to the Episcopal Church of the United States within the Anglican Communion.

Homosexuality laws in Nigeria 
In September 2006, the Standing Committee of the Church of Nigeria, headed by Akinola, issued a Message to the Nation, taking up ten political controversies in Nigeria, among them a bill regarding same-sex relationships: "The Church commends the law-makers for their prompt reaction to outlaw same-sex relationships in Nigeria and calls for the bill to be passed since the idea expressed in the bill is the moral position of Nigerians regarding human sexuality."  The bill in question, as well as criminalising same-sex marriage, also proposed to criminalise "Registration of Gay Clubs, Societies and organizations" and "Publicity, procession and public show of same-sex amorous relationship through the electronic or print media physically, directly, indirectly or otherwise", on penalty of up to 5 years of imprisonment. The proposed legislation was formally challenged by the United States State Department as a breach of Nigeria's obligations under the International Covenant on Civil and Political Rights.  Some western supporters justify the legislation on the basis that it does not support the stoning to death of homosexuals under the Sharia code.

Reaction to Muslim cartoon riots 
In February 2006, Muslims rioting over the Danish newspaper cartoon controversy spread to Nigeria.  Rioters targeted Christians and their property, resulting in a reported 43 deaths, 30 burned churches  and 250 destroyed shops and houses. Included among the victims was the family of one of Akinola's bishops, Ben Kwashi, the Bishop of Jos, who was out of the country at the time. Kwashi's home was broken into and his wife was tortured and sexually assaulted, resulting in her temporary blindness. The rioters also severely beat Kwashi's teenage son. In response to the rioting, Akinola issued a statement in his capacity as president of the Christian Association of Nigeria: "May we at this stage remind our Muslim brothers that they do not have the monopoly of violence in this nation." Some criticized this statement as inciting Christian counter-riots against Muslim targets in Nigeria. (For example, Christian mobs in Onitsha retaliated against Muslims, killing 80 persons and burned a Muslim district with 100 homes, forcing hundreds of Muslims to flee the city.) American evangelical leader Rick Warren, however, wrote that Akinola's angry response "was no more characteristic than Nelson Mandela's apartheid-era statement that 'sooner or later this violence is going to spread to whites'".

References

Further reading 
~

External links
Peter Akinola Foundation Official Website

1944 births
21st-century Anglican archbishops
Primates of the Church of Nigeria
Living people
Christian Association of Nigeria Presidents
Yoruba Christian clergy
People from Abeokuta
Evangelical Anglican bishops
20th-century Anglican bishops in Nigeria
20th-century Anglican archbishops
21st-century Anglican bishops in Nigeria
Commanders of the Order of the Niger
Anglican archbishops of Abuja
Anglican bishops of Abuja
Anglican realignment people